Beaver Creek Nature Area is a nature area in Minnehaha County, South Dakota in the United States. It is located along Beaver Creek, a tributary of  the Big Sioux River just east of Sioux Falls. Birdwatching, fishing, hiking, and snowmobiling are popular activities within this area. Wildlife found in the area include: Bald eagle, White-tailed deer, Coyote, Beaver, and many song birds and waterfowl.

See also
List of South Dakota state parks

References

External links
 Beaver Creek Nature Area - South Dakota Game, Fish, and Parks

Protected areas of Minnehaha County, South Dakota
Protected areas of South Dakota
State parks of South Dakota